Bogdan Mihai Moga (born 14 May 1995) is a Romanian professional footballer who plays as a goalkeeper for FK Csíkszereda.

Honours
ASA Târgu Mureș
Romanian Supercup (1): 2015

References

External links
 
 

1995 births
Living people
People from Târgu Mureș
Romanian footballers
Association football goalkeepers
Liga I players
Liga II players
ASA 2013 Târgu Mureș players
CS Pandurii Târgu Jiu players
CS Luceafărul Oradea players
ACS Viitorul Târgu Jiu players
FK Csíkszereda Miercurea Ciuc players